Bala Cynwyd Junior High School Complex, is a historic school complex in Bala Cynwyd, Pennsylvania. The complex includes the 'Bala Cynwyd Middle School, the Cynwyd Elementary School, and the former Lower Merion Academy. The elementary school and middle schools are part of the Lower Merion School District.

History

The Lower Merion Academy/Lower Merion Benevolent School building was built in 1812, and is a -story, five-bay, stuccoed stone building with cupola in the Federal style. It was renovated in 1938 in Colonial Revival style. The Cynwyd Elementary School building was built in 1914, with a rear addition built in 1920.  It is a -story, Classical Revival style building that features white terra cotta trim and a central entrance with Ionic order columns.  he Bala Cynwyd Middle School building was built in 1938, and is a long, flat, two-story brick building in the modern style.  A classroom wing was added in 1963.  The buildings were renovated and some additions built in 1999.

It was added to the National Register of Historic Places in 2002.

Next to the Lower Merion Academy building sits the school's old bell, cast in 1888 by McShane Bell Foundry of Baltimore, Maryland, and rededicated in 1976 according to a plaque affixed to the side.

References

External links
"History of Bala Cynwyd Middle School at Lower Merion School District website

School buildings on the National Register of Historic Places in Pennsylvania
Federal architecture in Pennsylvania
Neoclassical architecture in Pennsylvania
Colonial Revival architecture in Pennsylvania
School buildings completed in 1812
1812 establishments in Pennsylvania
Schools in Montgomery County, Pennsylvania
National Register of Historic Places in Montgomery County, Pennsylvania